Vandercook Lake High School is a high school in Jackson, Michigan, United States. It is the home of the Jayhawk and they compete in the Cascades Conference.

References

External links
Official site

Educational institutions in the United States with year of establishment missing
Jackson, Michigan
Public high schools in Michigan
Schools in Jackson County, Michigan